Breneman-Turner Mill is a historic grist mill located near Harrisonburg, Rockingham County, Virginia. It was built about 1800, and is a 2 1/2-story, Federal style brick building. The building retains its water wheel, measuring 16 feet in diameter and 5 feet wide, and three sets of burr stones. The mill survived General Philip Sheridan’s burning of the Shenandoah Valley in 1864, and remained in operation until 1988.

It was listed on the National Register of Historic Places in 2007.

References

External links
 Valley Brethren-Mennonite Heritage Center - owns and operates the Breneman-Turner Mill

Grinding mills on the National Register of Historic Places in Virginia
Federal architecture in Virginia
Industrial buildings completed in 1800
Buildings and structures in Rockingham County, Virginia
National Register of Historic Places in Rockingham County, Virginia
Grinding mills in Virginia
Museums in Rockingham County, Virginia